Hartlepool Art Gallery is an art gallery in Hartlepool, County Durham, England.

It is located in Church Square within Christ Church, a restored Victorian church, built in 1854 and designed by the architect Edward Buckton Lamb (1806–1869). The building has a 100-foot tower with six bells, which can still be rung.

Hartlepool Art Gallery is co-located with a tourist information centre close to Hartlepool railway station and the town centre. The temporary exhibition programme includes crafts, contemporary and fine art, and photography. There is also a permanent collection. The gallery is run by Hartlepool Borough Council.

See also 
 List of museums in County Durham

References

External links 
 Hartlepool  Art Gallery, Hartlepool Borough Council

Art museums established in 1996
1996 establishments in England
Museums in County Durham
Local museums in County Durham
Art museums and galleries in County Durham
Buildings and structures in Hartlepool
Former churches in County Durham